Wong-Nui Fung (1925–1992) was a former Chinese actress and Cantonese opera singer from Hong Kong. Fung is credited with over 250 films.

Early life 
In 1925, Fung was born as Guo Ruizhen in Guangdong province, China. Fung attended Jiefang Girls Middle School in Guangzhou, China.

Career 
At age 13, Fung started her career performing Cantonese opera. Fung studied under Zilan Nu. In 1950, Fung crossed over as an actress in Hong Kong films. Fung appeared in Monk in Love, a 1950 drama film directed by Wong Toi. Fung appeared in How Seven Heroes Crossed the Golden Bank (Part 1), a 1951 Historical drama Cantonese opera film directed by Yeung Kung-Leung. Fung appeared in The Twelve Beauties with both Yam Kim-fai and Pak Suet Sin, a 1952 Cantonese opera film directed by Chan Pei. By 1963, Fung is known for her rank as a  second huadan in Cantonese opera. Fung's last film was The Imperial Warrant, 1968 Cantonese opera film directed by Yang Fan. Fung is credited with over 250 films.

Repertoire 
This is a partial list.
 A Ten-Year Dream
 A Lady Prime Minister of Two Countries
 Return from Battle for His Love (aka The Marshal's Marriage) 
 Romance of the Phoenix Chamber (aka The Princess in Distress) 
 The Unruly Commander-in-chief and the Blunt General
(all have film version)

Theater Performance 
This is a partial list.
 1974, 2nd Hong Kong Arts Festival (self-financing 3 titles)
1. Xue Pinggui
2. Time To Go Home
3. Substituting a Racoon for the Prince
 1979, 7th Hong Kong Arts Festival
 1980, 8th Hong Kong Arts Festival

Filmography

Films 
This is a partial list of films.
 1950 Monk in Love 
 1952 The Twelve Beauties 
 1953 A Bachelor's Love Affair - Swindler.
 1953 The Humiliated Rickshaw-Puller - wife 
 1960 The Princess and Fok Wah
 1960 The Orphan Saved Her Adoptive Mother 
 1961 Three Battles to Secure Peace for Nation 
 1961 Dreams for the Past Events (aka Ten Years Dream) 
 1961 Feminine General 'Far Mok Lan' (aka Lady General Fa Muk-Lan) 
 1962 All Because of a Smile 
 1962 Kinship Is the Strongest Bond (aka An Agnostic and Sagacious Intercession) 
 1963 Lust Is the Worst Vice 
 1968 The Imperial Warrant

Television series 
 Police Woman
 Ladies and Gentlemen, Miss Fung Wong Nui

Personal life 
On December 1, 1992, Fung died in Hong Kong.

References

External links 
 Nu Fenghuang at imdb.com
 Fung Wong Nui at hkcinemagic.com
 Fung at info.gov.hk
 
 Fenghuangnu WorldCat ID

1925 births
1992 deaths
Hong Kong Cantonese opera actresses
Hong Kong film actresses